Jackson Township is one of fourteen townships in Miami County, Indiana, United States. As of the 2019 census, the town's population was 2,122 and it contained 843 housing units as of 2010.

History
The first settlement at Jackson Township was made in 1842. Jackson Township was organized in 1846. The township is named for Andrew Jackson, seventh President of the United States.

Geography

Cities, towns, villages
 Amboy
 Converse (partial)

Cemeteries
The township contains four cemeteries: Bond, Friends, Park Lawn and Pipe Creek.

Major highways
  Indiana State Road 18
  Indiana State Road 19

Airports and landing strips
 Converse Airport

Lakes
 Fox Lake

Education
 Oak Hill United School Corporation

Jackson Township residents may obtain a free library card from the Converse-Jackson Township Public Library in Converse.

Political districts
 Indiana's 5th congressional district
 State House District 32
 State Senate District 18

References
 
 United States Census Bureau 2008 TIGER/Line Shapefiles
 IndianaMap

External links
 Indiana Township Association
 United Township Association of Indiana
 City-Data.com page for Jackson Township

Townships in Miami County, Indiana
Townships in Indiana